Thomas A. Carew was a sculptor in Boston, Massachusetts, active between 1843 and 1860 in collaboration with Joseph Carew as the firm Carew & Brother.

Selected works 
 Charles T. Torrey, "Slave Monument" (late 1840s), Mount Auburn Cemetery
 Ralph Waldo Emerson, marble bas-relief, 1857

References 

 Glenn B. Opitz, Dictionary of American Sculptors, Apollo, 1984. .
 George Cuthbert Groce, David H. Wallace, Dictionary of Artists in America, 1564-1860, New York Historical Society, 1957.

American sculptors
Year of death missing
Year of birth missing